Walter Hiesel (born 13 March 1944) is an Austrian footballer. He played in two matches for the Austria national football team from 1964 to 1966.

References

External links
 

1944 births
Living people
Austrian footballers
Austria international footballers
Place of birth missing (living people)
Association footballers not categorized by position